The Wilkethöchi (or simply Wilket) (1,172 m) is a mountain of the Appenzell Alps, overlooking Dicken in the canton of St. Gallen.

References

External links
Wilkethöchi on Hikr

Mountains of the Alps
Mountains of the canton of St. Gallen
Appenzell Alps
Mountains of Switzerland